Saransh Jain (born 31 March 1993) is an Indian cricketer. He made his first-class debut for Madhya Pradesh in the 2014–15 Ranji Trophy on 21 December 2014. He made his List A debut for Madhya Pradesh in the 2016–17 Vijay Hazare Trophy on 25 February 2017.

References

External links
 

1993 births
Living people
Indian cricketers
Madhya Pradesh cricketers
Cricketers from Indore